Big City Radio (formerly Aston FM) is a British community radio station based in Aston, Birmingham. The station, owned and operated by Murfin Music International, broadcasts on 89.1FM in Aston and surrounding areas, on DAB and online via the station's website and mobile apps.

The station launched on 1 November 2005 as Aston FM, before rebranding as Big City four years later.

In November 2017 Big City Radio changed its mainstream output from classic contemporary music to 'Urban' and 'Specialised' programming.

In September 2022, the station began to tease a relaunch of the former Birmingham ILR brand BRMB on its website and social media.

Notable presenters 

Notable past presenters at the station include long-established West Midlands radio personality Les Ross who hosted Big City's breakfast show for four months from December 2009. He later returned to present a Sunday afternoon show for the station.

References

External links
89.1 Big City Radio website
Big City Radio at Media UK

Community radio stations in the United Kingdom
Radio stations in Birmingham, West Midlands
Radio stations established in 2005